The 1932 Chicago Maroons football team was an American football team that represented the University of Chicago during the 1932 Big Ten Conference football season In their 41st and final season under head coach Amos Alonzo Stagg, the Maroons compiled a 3–4–1 record, finished in ninth place in the Big Ten Conference, and outscored their opponents by a combined total of 95 to 94.

Schedule

References

Chicago
Chicago Maroons football seasons
Chicago Maroons football